The province of North Sulawesi is a province in Indonesia that was established as part of the separation of the province of North and Central Sulawesi into the province of North Sulawesi and the province of Central Sulawesi in 1964.

Governors of Sulawesi

Governors of North and Central Sulawesi

Governors of North Sulawesi 

Notes:

Acting governors 

The following is a list of acting governors of North Sulawesi. An acting governor is appointed when the incumbent governor's has completed and a new governor has not been appointed, or when the incumbent governor takes a leave of absence to campaign for the next gubernatorial elections.

References

Sulawesi
North Sulawesi
North Sulawesi